Otho Liston Burton (December 19, 1906 – September 18, 1971) was an American politician in the state of Florida.

Burton was from Hazel, Kentucky and moved to Florida in 1925. A lumber and building material dealer, he served in the Florida House of Representatives from 1947 to 1957 (77th district).

References

1906 births
1971 deaths
People from Calloway County, Kentucky
Democratic Party members of the Florida House of Representatives
20th-century American politicians